In various theistic religious traditions, an angel is a supernatural spiritual being who serves God.

Abrahamic religions often depict angels as benevolent celestial intermediaries between God (or Heaven) and humanity. Other roles include protectors and guides for humans, such as guardian angels, and servants of God. Abrahamic religions describe angelic hierarchies, which vary by religion and sect. Some angels have specific names (such as Gabriel or Michael) or titles (such as seraph or archangel). Those expelled from Heaven are called fallen angels, distinct from the heavenly host.

Angels in art are usually shaped like humans of extraordinary beauty, though this is not always the case—sometimes, they can be portrayed in a frightening, inhuman manner. They are often identified in Christian artwork with bird wings, halos, and divine light.

Etymology 
The word angel arrives in modern English from Old English engel (with a hard g) and the Old French angele. Both of these derive from Late Latin angelus, which in turn was borrowed from Late Greek  angelos (literally "messenger"). Τhe word's earliest form is Mycenaean a-ke-ro, attested in Linear B syllabic script. According to the Dutch linguist R. S. P. Beekes, ángelos itself may be "an Oriental loan, like ἄγγαρος (ángaros, 'Persian mounted courier')."

The rendering of "ángelos" is the Septuagint's default translation of the Biblical Hebrew term malʼākh, denoting simply "messenger" without connoting its nature. In the Latin Vulgate, this meaning becomes bifurcated: when malʼākh or ángelos is supposed to denote a human messenger, words like nuntius or legatus are applied. If the word refers to some supernatural being, the word angelus appears. Such differentiation has been taken over by later vernacular translations of the Bible, early Christian and Jewish exegetes and eventually modern scholars.

Zoroastrianism 

In Zoroastrianism there are different angel-like figures. For example, each person has one guardian angel, called Fravashi. They patronize human beings and other creatures, and also manifest God's energy. The Amesha Spentas have often been regarded as angels, although there is no direct reference to them conveying messages, but are rather emanations of Ahura Mazda ("Wise Lord", God); they initially appeared in an abstract fashion and then later became personalized, associated with various aspects of creation.

Abrahamic religions

Judaism 

In Judaism, angels ( mal’āḵ; "messenger"), are understood through interpretation of the Tanakh and in a long tradition as supernatural beings who stand by God in heaven, but are strictly to be distinguished from God (YHWH) and are subordinate to him. Occasionally, they can show selected people God's will and instructions. In the Jewish tradition they are also inferior to humans since they have no will of their own and are able to carry out only one divine command.

Hebrew Bible 

The term  is also used in other books of the Hebrew Bible. Depending on the context, the Hebrew word may refer to a human messenger or to a supernatural messenger. A human messenger might be a prophet or priest, such as Malachi, "my messenger"; the Greek superscription in the Septuagint translation states the Book of Malachi was written "by the hand of his messenger" . Examples of a supernatural messenger are the "Malak YHWH," who is either a messenger from God, an aspect of God (such as the logos), or God himself as the messenger (the "theophanic angel.")

Michael D. Coogan notes that it is only in the late books that the terms "come to mean the benevolent semi-divine beings familiar from later mythology and art." Daniel is the biblical book to refer to individual angels by name, mentioning Gabriel in Daniel 9:21 and Michael in Daniel 10:13. These angels are part of Daniel's apocalyptic visions and are an important part of apocalyptic literature.

In Daniel 7, Daniel receives a dream-vision from God. [...] As Daniel watches, the Ancient of Days takes his seat on the throne of heaven and sits in judgement in the midst of the heavenly court [...] an [angel] like a son of man approaches the Ancient One in the clouds of heaven and is given everlasting kingship.

Coogan explains the development of this concept of angels: "In the postexilic period, with the development of explicit monotheism, these divine beings—the 'sons of God' who were members of the Divine Council—were in effect demoted to what are now known as 'angels', understood as beings created by God, but immortal and thus superior to humans." This conception of angels is best understood in contrast to demons and is often thought to be "influenced by the ancient Persian religious tradition of Zoroastrianism, which viewed the world as a battleground between forces of good and forces of evil, between light and darkness." One of these is hāššāṭān, a figure depicted in (among other places) the Book of Job.

Rabbinic Judaism 
According to Rabbinic Judaism, the angels have no bodies, but are eternally living creatures created out of fire. The Babylonian Talmud reads as "The Torah was not given to ministering angels." (לא נתנה תורה למלאכי השרת) usually understood as a concession to human's imperfection, in contrast to the angels. Thus, they occasionally appear in Midrashim as competition with humans. The angels as heavenly beings, strictly following the laws of God, become jealous of God's affection for man. Humans, by following the Torah, in prayer, by resisting evil instincts (yetzer hara) and by teshuva, are preferred to the flawless angels. As a result, they are also inferior to humans in the Jewish tradition. In the Midrash, the plural of El (Elohim) used in Genesis in relation to the creation of human beings is explained by the presence of angels: God therefore consulted with the angels, but made the final decision alone. This story serves as an example, teaching that the powerful should also consult with the weak. God's own final decision highlights God's undisputable omnipotence.

In post-Biblical Judaism, certain angels took on particular significance and developed unique personalities and roles. Although these archangels were believed to rank among the heavenly host, no systematic hierarchy ever developed. Metatron is considered one of the highest of the angels in Merkabah and Kabbalah mysticism and often serves as a scribe; he is briefly mentioned in the Talmud and figures prominently in Merkabah mystical texts. Michael, who serves as a warrior and advocate for Israel, is looked upon particularly fondly. Gabriel is mentioned in the Book of Daniel and briefly in the Talmud, as well as in many Merkabah mystical texts. There is no evidence in Judaism for the worship of angels, but there is evidence for the invocation and sometimes even conjuration of angels.

Philo of Alexandria identifies the angel with the Logos inasmuch as the angel is the immaterial voice of God. The angel is something different from God himself, but is conceived as God's instrument.

Later interpretations 
According to Kabbalah, there are four worlds and our world is the last world: the world of action (Assiyah). Angels exist in the worlds above as a 'task' of God. They are an extension of God to produce effects in this world. After an angel has completed its task, it ceases to exist. The angel is in effect the task. This is derived from the book of Genesis when Abraham meets with three angels and Lot meets with two. The task of one of the angels was to inform Sara and Abraham of their coming child. The other two were to save Lot and to destroy Sodom and Gomorrah.

Jewish philosopher Maimonides explained his view of angels in his Guide for the Perplexed II:4 and II
Maimonides had a neo-Aristotelian interpretation of the Bible. Maimonides writes that to the wise man, one sees that what the Bible and Talmud refer to as "angels" are actually allusions to the various laws of nature; they are the principles by which the physical universe operates.

Individuals 
From the Jewish Encyclopedia, entry "Angelology".
 Michael (archangel) (translation: who is like God?), kindness of God, and stands up for the children of mankind
 Gabriel (archangel) (translation: God is my strength), performs acts of justice and power
(Only these two angels are mentioned by name in the Hebrew Bible; the rest are from extra-biblical tradition.)
 Jophiel (translation: Beauty of God), expelled Adam and Eve from the Garden of Eden holding a flaming sword and punishes those who transgress against God.
 Raphael (archangel) (translation: It is God who heals), God's healing force
 Uriel (archangel) (translation: God is my light), leads humanity to destiny
 Samael (archangel) (translation: Venom of God), angel of death—see also Malach HaMavet (translation: the angel of death)
 Sandalphon (archangel) (translation: bringing together), battles Samael and brings mankind together

Christianity 

Christians inherited Jewish understandings of angels, which in turn may have been partly inherited from the Egyptians. In the early stage, the Christian concept of an angel characterized the angel as a messenger of God. Later came identification of individual angelic messengers: Gabriel, Michael, Raphael, and Uriel. Then, in the space of little more than two centuries (from the 3rd to the 5th) the image of angels took on definite characteristics both in theology and in art. Ellen Muehlberger has argued that in late antiquity, angels were conceived of as one type of being among many, whose primary purpose was to guard and to guide Christians.

Christian Bible
Angels are represented throughout Christian Bibles as spiritual beings intermediate between God and humans: "Yet you have made them [humans] a little lower than God, and crowned them with glory and honor.". Greek translations of the Hebrew Bible refer to intermediary beings, as angels, instead of daimons, thus giving raise to a distinction between demons and angels. In the Old Testament, both benevolent and fierce angels are mentioned, but never called demons. The symmetry lies between angels sent by God, and intermediary spirits of foreign deities, not in good and evil deeds.

In the New Testament, the existence of angels, just like that of demons, is taken for granted. They can intervene and intercede on behalf of humans. Angels protect the righteous. They dwell in the heavens, act as God's warriors and worship God. In the parable of the Rich man and Lazarus, angels behave as psychopomps. The Resurrection of Jesus features angels, telling the woman that Jesus is no longer in the tomb, but has risen from the dead.

Interaction with humans 

Three separate cases of angelic interaction deal with the births of John the Baptist and Jesus. In Luke 1:11, an angel appears to Zechariah to inform him that he will have a child despite his old age, thus proclaiming the birth of John the Baptist. In Luke 1:26 Gabriel visits Mary in the Annunciation to foretell the birth of Jesus. Angels proclaim the birth of Jesus in the Adoration of the shepherds in Luke 2:10.

According to Matthew 4:11, after Jesus spent 40 days in the desert, "...the Devil left him and, behold, angels came and ministered to him." In Luke 22:43 an angel comforts Jesus during the Agony in the Garden. In Matthew 28:5 an angel speaks at the empty tomb, following the Resurrection of Jesus and the rolling back of the stone by angels.

In 1851 Pope Pius IX approved the Chaplet of Saint Michael based on the 1751 reported private revelation from archangel Michael to the Carmelite nun Antonia d'Astonac. In a biography of Gemma Galgani written by Germanus Ruoppolo, Galgani stated that she had spoken with her guardian angel.

Pope John Paul II emphasized the role of angels in Catholic teachings in his 1986 address titled "Angels Participate In History Of Salvation", in which he suggested that modern mentality should come to see the importance of angels.

According to the Vatican's Congregation for Divine Worship and the Discipline of the Sacraments, "The practice of assigning names to the Holy Angels should be discouraged, except in the cases of Gabriel, Raphael and Michael whose names are contained in Holy Scripture."

Theology 

According to Augustine of Hippo, "'Angel' is the name of their office, not of their nature. If you seek the name of their nature, it is 'spirit'; if you seek the name of their office, it is 'angel': from what they are, 'spirit', from what they do, 'angel'." Gregory of Nazianzus thought that angels were made as "spirits" and "flames of fire", following Hebrews 1, and that they can be identified with the "thrones, dominions, rulers and authorities" of Colossians 1.

By the late 4th century, the Church Fathers agreed that there were different categories of angels, with appropriate missions and activities assigned to them. There was, however, some disagreement regarding the nature of angels. Some argued that angels had physical bodies, while some maintained that they were entirely spiritual. Some theologians had proposed that angels were not divine but on the level of immaterial beings subordinate to the Trinity. The resolution of this Trinitarian dispute included the development of doctrine about angels.

Forty Gospel Homilies by Pope Gregory I (c. 540 – 12 March 604) noted angels and archangels. The Fourth Lateran Council's (1215) Firmiter credimus decree (issued against the Albigenses) declared that the angels were created beings and that men were created after them. The First Vatican Council (1869) repeated this declaration in Dei Filius, the "Dogmatic constitution on the Catholic faith".

Thomas Aquinas (13th century) relates angels to Aristotle's metaphysics in his Summa contra Gentiles, Summa Theologica, and in De substantiis separatis, a treatise on angelology. Although angels have greater knowledge than men, they are not omniscient, as Matthew 24:36 points out. According to the Summa Theologica, angels were created instantaneously by God in a state of grace in the Empyrean Heaven (LXI. 4) at the same time when he created all the contents of the corporeal world (LXI. 3). They are pure spirits whose life consists in knowledge and love. Being bodiless, their knowledge is intellectual and not through senses (LIV. 5). Differently from humans, their knowledge is not acquired from the exterior world; moreover they attain to the truth of a thing at a single glance without need of reasoning (LV. a; LVIII. 3,4). They know all that passes in the external world (LV. 2) and the totality of creatures, but they don't know human secret thoughts that depends on human free will and thereby are not necessarily linked up with external events (LVII. 4). They don't know also the future unless God reveals it to them (LVII. 3).

According to Aquinas, angels are the closest creatures to God. Therefore, like God, they are constituted by pure form without matter. Each angel is a species which a unique individual belongs to; angels differ one from another by way of their unique and irrepetible form. In other words, form -and not matter- is their principle of individuation.

The New Church (Swedenborgianism) 
The New Church denominations that arose from the writings of theologian Emanuel Swedenborg have distinct ideas about angels and the spiritual world in which they dwell. Adherents believe that all angels are in human form with a spiritual body, and are not just minds without form. There are different orders of angels according to the three heavens, and each angel dwells in one of innumerable societies of angels. Such a society of angels can appear as one angel as a whole.

All angels originate from the human race, and there is not one angel in heaven who first did not live in a material body. Moreover, all children who die not only enter heaven but eventually become angels. The life of angels is that of usefulness, and their functions are so many that they cannot be enumerated. However each angel will enter a service according to the use that they had performed in their earthly life. Names of angels, such as Michael, Gabriel, and Raphael, signify a particular angelic function rather than an individual being.

While living in one's body an individual has conjunction with heaven through the angels, and with each person, there are at least two evil spirits and two angels. Temptation or pains of conscience originates from a conflict between evil spirits and angels. Due to man's sinful nature it is dangerous to have open direct communication with angels and they can only be seen when one's spiritual sight has been opened. Thus from moment to moment angels attempt to lead each person to what is good tacitly using the person's own thoughts.

Latter Day Saints 

The Latter Day Saint movement views angels as the messengers of God. They are sent to mankind to deliver messages, minister to humanity, teach doctrines of salvation, call mankind to repentance, give priesthood keys, save individuals in perilous times, and guide humankind.

Latter Day Saints believe that angels either are the spirits of humans who are deceased or who have yet to be born, or are humans who have been resurrected or translated and have physical bodies of flesh and bones. Joseph Smith taught that "there are no angels who minister to this earth but those that do belong or have belonged to it." As such, Latter Day Saints also believe that Adam, the first man, was and is now the archangel Michael, and that Gabriel lived on the earth as Noah. Likewise the Angel Moroni first lived in a pre-Columbian American civilization as the 5th-century prophet-warrior named Moroni.

Smith described his first angelic encounter in the following manner:

Most angelic visitations in the early Latter Day Saint movement were witnessed by Smith and Oliver Cowdery, who both said (prior to the establishment of the church in 1830) they had been visited by the prophet Moroni, John the Baptist, and the apostles Peter, James, and John. Later, after the dedication of the Kirtland Temple, Smith and Cowdery said they had been visited by Jesus, and subsequently by Moses, Elias, and Elijah.

Others who said they received a visit by an angel include the other two of the Three Witnesses: David Whitmer and Martin Harris. Many other Latter Day Saints, both in the early and modern church, have said they had seen angels, although Smith posited that, except in extenuating circumstances such as the restoration, mortals teach mortals, spirits teach spirits, and resurrected beings teach other resurrected beings.

Islam 

Belief in angels is fundamental to Islam. The Quranic word for angel derives either from Malaka, meaning "he controlled", due to their power to govern different affairs assigned to them, or from the root either from ʼ-l-k, l-ʼ-k or m-l-k with the broad meaning of a "messenger", just like its counterparts in Hebrew (malʾákh) and Greek (angelos). Unlike their Hebrew counterpart, the term is exclusively used for heavenly spirits of the divine world, but not for human messengers. The Quran refers to both angelic and human messengers as "rasul" instead. Contrary to popular belief, angels are never described as agents of revelation in the Quran, although interpretation credits Gabriel with that.

The Quran is the principal source for the Islamic concept of angels. Some of them, such as Gabriel and Michael, are mentioned by name in the Quran, others are only referred to by their function. In hadith literature, angels are often assigned to only one specific phenomenon. Angels play a significant role in Mi'raj literature, where Muhammad encounters several angels during his journey through the heavens. Further angels have often been featured in Islamic eschatology, Islamic theology and Islamic philosophy. Duties assigned to angels include, for example, communicating revelations from God, glorifying God, recording every person's actions, and taking a person's soul at the time of death.

In Islam, just like in Judaism and Christianity, angels are often represented in anthropomorphic forms combined with supernatural images, such as wings, being of great size or wearing heavenly articles. The Quran describes them as "messengers with wings—two, or three, or four: He [God] adds to Creation as He pleases..." Common characteristics for angels are their missing needs for bodily desires, such as eating and drinking. Their lack of affinity to material desires is also expressed by their creation from light: Angels of mercy are created from nur (cold light) in opposition to the angels of punishment created from nar (hot light). Muslims do not generally share the perceptions of angelic pictorial depictions, such as those found in Western art.

Although believing in angels remain one of Six Articles of Faith in Islam, one can not find a dogmatic angelology in Islamic tradition. Despite this, scholars had discussed the role of angels from specific canonical events, such as the Mi'raj, and Quranic verses. Even if they are not in focus, they have been featured in folklore, philosophy debates and systematic theology. While in classical Islam, widespread notions were accepted as canonical, there is a tendency in contemporary scholarship to reject much material about angels, like calling the Angel of Death by the name Azra'il.

In Folk Islam, individual angels may be evoked in exorcism rites, whose names are engraved in talismans or amulets.

Some modern scholars have emphasized a metaphorical reinterpretation of the concept of angels.

Baháʼí faith 
In his Kitáb-i-Íqán Baháʼu'lláh, founder of the Baháʼí Faith, describes angels as people who "have consumed, with the fire of the love of God, all human traits and limitations", and have "clothed themselves" with angelic attributes and have become "endowed with the attributes of the spiritual". ʻAbdu'l-Bahá describes angels as the "confirmations of God and His celestial powers" and as "blessed beings who have severed all ties with this nether world" and "been released from the chains of self", and "revealers of God's abounding grace". The Baháʼí writings also refer to the Concourse on High, an angelic host, and the Maid of Heaven of Baháʼu'lláh's vision.

Neoplatonism 
Philo of Alexandria already identified the Neo-Platonic interpretation of daemons as angels. The daemons were thought to be intermediary between the supernatural and earthly realm, interpreted by Philo as the Greek term for angels.

In the commentaries of Proclus (4th century) on the Timaeus of Plato, Proclus uses the terminology of "angelic" (aggelikos) and "angel" (aggelos) in relation to metaphysical beings. According to Aristotle, just as there is a Prime Mover, so, too, must there be spiritual secondary movers.

Ibn Sina, who drew upon the Neo-Platonistic emanation cosmology of Al-Farabi, developed an angelological hierarchy of Intellects, which are created by "the One". Therefore, the first creation by God was the supreme archangel followed by other archangels, who are identified with lower Intellects. From these Intellects again, emanated lower angels or "moving spheres", from which in turn, emanated other Intellects until it reaches the Intellect, which reigns over the souls. The tenth Intellect is responsible for bringing material forms into being and illuminating the minds.

Sikhism 

The poetry of the holy scripture of the Sikhs – the Sri Guru Granth Sahib – figuratively mentions a messenger or angel of death, sometimes as Yam (ਜਮ – "Yam") and sometimes as Azrael (ਅਜਰਾਈਲੁ – "Ajraeel"):

In a similar vein, the Sri Guru Granth Sahib talks of a figurative Chitar (ਚਿਤ੍ਰ) and Gupat (ਗੁਪਤੁ):

However, Sikhism has never had a literal system of angels, preferring guidance without explicit appeal to supernatural orders or beings.

Esotericism

Hermetic Qabalah 

According to the Kabbalah as described by the Golden Dawn there are ten archangels, each commanding one of the choirs of angels and corresponding to one of the Sephirot. It is similar to the Jewish angelic hierarchy.

Theosophy 
In the teachings of the Theosophical Society, Devas are regarded as living either in the atmospheres of the planets of the Solar System (Planetary Angels) or inside the Sun (Solar Angels) and they help to guide the operation of the processes of nature such as the process of evolution and the growth of plants; their appearance is reputedly like colored flames about the size of a human. It is believed by Theosophists that devas can be observed when the third eye is activated. Some (but not most) devas originally incarnated as human beings.

It is believed by Theosophists that nature spirits, elementals (gnomes, undines, sylphs, and salamanders), and fairies also can be observed when the third eye is activated. It is maintained by Theosophists that these less evolutionarily developed beings have never been previously incarnated as humans; they are regarded as being on a separate line of spiritual evolution called the "deva evolution"; eventually, as their souls advance as they reincarnate, it is believed they will incarnate as devas.

It is asserted by Theosophists that all of the above-mentioned beings possess etheric bodies that are composed of etheric matter, a type of matter finer and more pure that is composed of smaller particles than ordinary physical plane matter.

Other

The Greek magical papyri, a set of texts forming into a completed grimoire that date somewhere between 100 BC and 400 AD, also list the names of the angels found in monotheistic religions, but they are presented as deities.

Numerous references to angels present themselves in the Nag Hammadi Library, in which they both appear as malevolent servants of the Demiurge and innocent associates of the aeons.

Brahma Kumaris 
The Brahma Kumaris uses the term "angel" to refer to a perfect, or complete state of the human being, which they believe can be attained through a connection with God. It is expanded as a state of being rather that an entity.

Yazidism 

In Yazidism, there are seven Divine Beings (often called 'angels' in the literature) who were created by God prior to the creation of this world. God appointed Tawûsî Melek as their leader and assigned all of the world's affairs to these seven Divine Beings. These Divine Beings are referred to as Tawûsî Melek, Melek Şemsedîn, Melek Nasirdîn, Melek Fexredîn, Melek Sicadîn, Melek Şêxsin and Melek Şêxûbekir.

In art 

According to mainstream Christian theology, angels are wholly spiritual beings and therefore do not eat, excrete or have sex, and have no gender. Although their different roles, such as warriors for some archangels, may suggest a human gender, Christian artists were careful not to given them specific gender attributes, at least until the 19th century, when some acquire breasts for example.

In an address during a General Audience of 6 August 1986, entitled "Angels participate in the history of salvation", Pope John Paul II explained that "[T]he angels have no 'body' (even if, in particular circumstances, they reveal themselves under visible forms because of their mission for the good of people)." Christian art perhaps reflects the descriptions in Revelation 4:6–8 of the Four Living Creatures and the descriptions in the Hebrew Bible of cherubim and seraphim (the chayot in Ezekiel's Merkabah vision and the Seraphim of Isaiah). However, while cherubim and seraphim have wings in the Bible, no angel is mentioned as having wings.
The earliest known Christian image of an angel—in the Cubicolo dell'Annunziazione in the Catacomb of Priscilla (mid-3rd century)—is without wings. In that same period, representations of angels on sarcophagi, lamps and reliquaries also show them without wings, as for example the angel in the Sacrifice of Isaac scene in the Sarcophagus of Junius Bassus (although the side view of the Sarcophagus shows winged angelic figures).

The earliest known representation of angels with wings is on the "Prince's Sarcophagus", attributed to the time of Theodosius I (379–395), discovered at Sarigüzel, near Istanbul, in the 1930s. From that period on, Christian art has represented angels mostly with wings, as in the cycle of mosaics in the Basilica of Saint Mary Major (432–440). Four- and six-winged angels, drawn from the higher grades of angels (especially cherubim and seraphim) and often showing only their faces and wings, are derived from Persian art and are usually shown only in heavenly contexts, as opposed to performing tasks on earth. They often appear in the pendentives of church domes or semi-domes. Prior to the Judeo-Christian tradition, in the Greek world the goddess Nike and the gods Eros and Thanatos were also depicted in human-like form with wings.

John Chrysostom explained the significance of angels' wings:

Angels are typically depicted in Mormon art as having no wings based on a quote from Joseph Smith ("An angel of God never has wings").

In terms of their clothing, angels, especially the Archangel Michael, were depicted as military-style agents of God and came to be shown wearing Late Antique military uniform. This uniform could be the normal military dress, with a tunic to about the knees, an armour breastplate and pteruges, but was often the specific dress of the bodyguard of the Byzantine Emperor, with a long tunic and the loros, the long gold and jewelled pallium restricted to the Imperial family and their closest guards.

The basic military dress was shown in Western art into the Baroque period and beyond (see Reni picture above), and up to the present day in Eastern Orthodox icons. Other angels came to be conventionally depicted in long robes, and in the later Middle Ages they often wear the vestments of a deacon, a cope over a dalmatic. This costume was used especially for Gabriel in Annunciation scenes—for example the Annunciation in Washington by Jan van Eyck.

Some types of angels are described as possessing more unusual or frightening attributes, such as the fiery bodies of the Seraphim, and the wheel-like structures of the Ophanim.

See also

References

Sources

Further reading 

 Bamberger, Bernard Jacob, (15 March 2006). Fallen Angels: Soldiers of Satan's Realm. Jewish Publication Society of America. 
 Barker, Margaret (2004). An Extraordinary Gathering of Angels, M Q Publications.  
 
 Briggs, Constance Victoria, 1997. The Encyclopedia of Angels : An A-to-Z Guide with Nearly 4,000 Entries. Plume. .
 Bunson, Matthew, (1996). Angels A to Z: A Who's Who of the Heavenly Host. Three Rivers Press. .
 Cheyne, James Kelly (ed.) (1899). Angel. Encyclopædia Biblica. New York, Macmillan.
 Cruz, Joan Carroll, OCDS, 1999. Angels and Devils. TAN Books and Publishers, Inc. 
 Cummings, Owen F., 2023. Angels In Scripture and Tradition, Paulist Press, New Jersey.  
 
 Davidson, Gustav, (1967). A Dictionary of Angels: Including the Fallen Angels. Free Press. 
 Driver, Samuel Rolles (Ed.) (1901) The book of Daniel. Cambridge UP.
 Graham, Billy, 1994. Angels: God's Secret Agents. W Pub Group; Minibook edition. 
 Guiley, Rosemary, 1996. Encyclopedia of Angels. 
 Jastrow, Marcus, 1996, A dictionary of the Targumim, the Talmud Bavli and Yerushalmi, and the Midrashic literature compiled by Marcus Jastrow, PhD., Litt.D. with and index of Scriptural quotatons, Vol 1 & 2, The Judaica Press, New York
 Kainz, Howard P., "Active and Passive Potency" in Thomistic Angelology Martinus Nijhoff. 
 Kreeft, Peter J. 1995. Angels and Demons: What Do We Really Know About Them? Ignatius Press. 

 Lewis, James R. (1995). Angels A to Z. Visible Ink Press. 
 Melville, Francis, 2001. The Book of Angels: Turn to Your Angels for Guidance, Comfort, and Inspiration. Barron's Educational Series; 1st edition. 
 Michalak, Aleksander R. (2012), Angels as Warriors in Late Second Temple Jewish Literature.Mohr Siebeck. .
 Muehlberger, Ellen (2013). Angels in Late Ancient Christianity. Oxford University Press. 
 Oosterzee, Johannes Jacobus van. Christian dogmatics: a text-book for academical instruction and private study. Trans. John Watson Watson and Maurice J. Evans. (1874) New York, Scribner, Armstrong.
 
 Ronner, John, 1993. Know Your Angels: The Angel Almanac With Biographies of 100 Prominent Angels in Legend & Folklore-And Much More! Mamre Press. .
 Smith, George Adam (1898) The book of the twelve prophets, commonly called the minor. London, Hodder and Stoughton.
 
 Swedenborg E. Heaven and its Wonders and Hell From Things Heard and Seen (Swedenborg Foundation 1946),  (Detailed information on angels and their life in heaven)
 Swedenborg, E. Wisdom's Delight in Marriage ("Conjugial") Love: Followed by Insanity's Pleasure in Promiscuous Love (Swedenborg Foundation 1979 ) (Extensive review of angelic marriage)
 von Heijne, Camilla, 2010. The Messenger of the Lord in Early Jewish Interpretations of Genesis. BZAW 412. De Gruyter, Berlin/New York, 
 von Heijne, Camilla, 2015 "Angels" pp. 20–24 in The Oxford Encyclopedia of the Bible and Theology, vol. 1. Oxford University Press, New York.

External links 

 Coptic Doxology of Heavenly Order
 Zoroastrian angels
 Jewish Encyclopedia entry on angels
 Directory on popular piety and the liturgy. Principles and guidelines Congregation for Divine Worship and the Discipline of the Sacraments. Directory of Popular Piety and the Liturgy, §§ 212–217, "The Holy Angels, Vatican City, December 2001]
 Angels, BBC Radio 4 discussion with Martin Palmer, Valery Rees & John Haldane (In Our Time'', Mar. 24, 2005)

 
Heraldic charges
Heaven in Christianity
ne:परी